Pony Express is an American western television series about the adventures of an agent in the 1860s of the Central Overland Express Company, better known as the Pony Express. The half-hour program starring Grant Sullivan and Don Dorrell was created by California National Productions. Pony Express ran for thirty-five episodes in syndication from the fall of October 1959 until May 1960. In its final days, the series just managed to coincide with the centennial of the Pony Express (April 3, 1860).

Overview
The series featured two recurring roles: Grant Sullivan as Brett Clark, a roving investigator for the company, and Don Dorrell as Donovan, a young Pony Express rider. The majority of the weekly episodes involved Clark and Donovan solving various Pony Express mysteries.

Production
Pony Express was filmed at Iverson Movie Ranch in Chatsworth in Los Angeles County, California. It was one of several western-themed television shows produced by CNP, including Boots and Saddles (1957–1958) and Union Pacific (1959–1960) and Frontier (1955-1956). CNP created the series for the 100th anniversary of the actual Pony Express.

The Pony Express pilot, the first Western television pilot shot in colour, was shot in February 1957 with James Best in the lead. This version did not sell (although Best was included in a TV Guide photo feature on upcoming TV westerns in June of that year) but was later aired, slightly re-edited, as an episode of the syndicated series.

Guest stars

Claude Akins
James Best
George Brenlin
Steve Brodie
Whitney Blake
Sebastian Cabot
Paul Carr
Walter Coy
Ross Elliott
William Fawcett
Joe Flynn
Douglas Fowley
Dabbs Greer
Rex Holman
Dale Ishimoto

I. Stanford Jolley
Dick Jones
Douglas Kennedy
Ethan Laidlaw
Norman Leavitt
Bethel Leslie
Nobu McCarthy
Howard McNear
Mort Mills
Donald Murphy
Gregg Palmer
James Parnell
Slim Pickens
Denver Pyle
Burt Reynolds
Madlyn Rhue

Episodes

See also 
 Pony Express, film

References

External links 
 
Pony Express at CVTA

1959 American television series debuts
1960 American television series endings
Black-and-white American television shows
English-language television shows
First-run syndicated television programs in the United States
Period television series
Television shows set in Colorado
Television shows set in Nebraska
1950s Western (genre) television series
Works about the Pony Express
1960s Western (genre) television series